is a romantic comedy Japanese film with thriller elements directed by Akiyoshi Sugiura and released in 2006 by VAP. It is part of the Akihabara Trilogy of films revolving around the Akihabara cosplay and otaku subcultures, especially maid cafés. It was distributed in the United States by Asia Pulp Cinema.

Plot
A shy law student falls in love with a maid café worker and tries to win her heart with the help of his friend who is a NEET otaku and idol pop fan, while a mysterious stalker follows their steps.

Cast
Jun Takatsuki 	
Taketora Morita 	
Taichi Hirabayashi

External links
Official website (archived)

References

2006 films
2000s Japanese-language films
Films set in Tokyo
2000s Japanese films
Cosplay
Akihabara
Japanese romantic comedy films
Otaku in fiction